Eka Alenka Vogelnik (born 1946, Ljubljana) is a Slovene illustrator, costume designer, puppeteer and director.

Career
Eka Vogelnik graduated in architecture and painting, and works primarily as an illustrator, set and costume designer, as well as in puppet making and puppeteering. She has illustrated over 30 books, been the artistic designer for more than 30 theatre productions and is the author of 7 puppet shows, and numerous film and TV productions. In the recent years she has been involved mainly in developing different types of puppets and teaching puppetry.

Films
Some of her puppet animated films, mostly using stop-motion animation are:

Makalonca (based on a story by Fran Saleški Finžgar) 1994
En prišparan tolar (A Tolar saved) 1999 (visually drawing on the Danse Macabre mural from Hrastovlje)
Bisergora (Pearl Mountain) 2001
Pozabljene knjige naših babic (The Forgotten Books of Our Grannies) series:
Mojca Pokraculja 2000
Trdoglav in Marjetica (Trdoglav and Marjetica) 2001
Butalci 2003
O šivilji in škarjicah (The Seamstress and Her Scissors) 2005

References

1946 births
Living people
Slovenian illustrators
Slovenian women illustrators
Costume designers
Slovenian puppeteers
Slovenian film directors
Slovenian women film directors
Artists from Ljubljana
Slovenian women artists